Trigraph of Christ is a fresco fragment by Andrea Mantegna, dated to 1452. It was originally above the main doorway of Basilica of Saint Anthony of Padua and is now in the city's Museo Antoniano. It shows Christ represented by the trigraph 'IHS', between Antony of Padua (left) and Bernardino of Siena (right).

Bibliography
Ettore Camesasca, 'Mantegna', in AA.VV., Pittori del Rinascimento, Scala, Firenze 2007. 

1452 paintings
Church frescos in Italy
Paintings by Andrea Mantegna
Paintings of Anthony of Padua
Paintings of Bernardino of Siena